Cyrus Hoopes House and Barn is a historic home and barn located in West Marlborough Township, Chester County, Pennsylvania. The house was built about 1825, with a major wing added about 1860.  The original section is three stories and four bays wide.  The wing added two additional bays.  The house had four bay wide porches and is constructed of stuccoed stone. It displays Greek Revival style design influences. The frame bank barn was built about 1887. It replaced an earlier barn that burned in a fire in 1884.  Also on the property are the remains of a limestone quarry and lime kiln.

It was added to the National Register of Historic Places in 1985.

References

Houses on the National Register of Historic Places in Pennsylvania
Barns on the National Register of Historic Places in Pennsylvania
Greek Revival houses in Pennsylvania
Houses completed in 1825
Houses in Chester County, Pennsylvania
Barns in Pennsylvania
National Register of Historic Places in Chester County, Pennsylvania